Lies Jans (born 20 January 1974, in Anderlecht) is a Belgian politician and is affiliated to the N-VA. She was elected as a member of the Flemish Parliament in 2009.

References

Living people
Members of the Flemish Parliament
New Flemish Alliance politicians
1974 births
People from Anderlecht
21st-century Belgian politicians